The Adventures of Parsley is a 32-episode children's television series animated in stop motion. Produced by FilmFair, The Adventures of Parsley was a spin-off of The Herbs. Its opening credits featured either Parsley the lion roaring or Dill the dog barking with their head in a circle, in parody of MGM's logo. Unlike in The Herbs the animal characters talked, a typical episode featuring a dialogue between the overenthusiastic Dill and the more laid back, deadpan Parsley. Other characters from The Herbs made occasional appearances.  As in The Herbs the narration was provided by actor Gordon Rollings.

Like The Herbs, The Adventures of Parsley were created and written by Michael Bond, directed by Ivor Wood, and shown on BBC1 where the latter series was first shown on 6 April 1970. The five-minute episodes concluded the day's broadcast of children's programmes, and preceded the BBC's early evening news broadcast.

Episodes

Home releases
 Roadshow Entertainment (2001)

Book adaptation
A book compiling the stories of several episodes, The Adventures of Parsley the Lion, was also released.

References

External links

 

1970 British television series debuts
1971 British television series endings
1970s British animated television series
1970s British children's television series
BBC children's television shows
British children's animated adventure television series
British children's animated comedy television series
British stop-motion animated television series
Television series by FilmFair
Television series by DHX Media
British television spin-offs
English-language television shows